Dorypetalidae is a family of millipedes in the order Callipodida. The family contains at least 4 genera and about 10 species.

Genera 
There are four known genera divided into two subfamilies:

Subfamily Dorypetalinae

 Dorypetalum  

Subfamily Cyphocallipodinae

 Cyphocallipus 
 Dorycallipus 
 Lusitanipus

References 

Callipodida
Millipede families